Arcinella arcinella, or the Caribbean spiny jewel box clam, is a species of bivalve mollusc in the family Chamidae.

Description
Arcinella arcinella has a shell reaching a size of about 55 mm. The shells of this common Caribbean species are pale brown to yellowish white in color with about 20 rows of spines. The interior is white. These molluscs are suspension filter feeders.

<div align=center>
Right and left valve of the same specimen:

</div align=center>

Distribution
This species can be found in Caribbean waters, ranging from the West Indies to South America. It is present at a depth from 2 to 73 m.

References

External links
 WoRMS
 Encyclopedia of life
 Malacolog

Chamidae
Molluscs described in 1767
Taxa named by Carl Linnaeus